Michael Hollingsworth (also Hollingworth, born 16 October 1943) is a former Australian road and track cyclist. Hollingworth competed in the individual road race at the 1964 Summer Olympics in Tokyo. He finished the race in 14th place, two places behind Eddy Merckx.

After the 1964 Olympics Hollingsworth turned professional. He competed in the Sun Tour six times and won several stages of the race.

Hollingsworth has been a member of Carnegie Caulfield Cycling Club since 1959. He has served as club president and currently coaches junior cyclists at the club.

References

External links
 

1943 births
Living people
Australian male cyclists
Olympic cyclists of Australia
Cyclists at the 1964 Summer Olympics
Place of birth missing (living people)